The 2022 Norman, Oklahoma, mayoral election was held on February 8, 2022, with Larry Heikkila and Breea Clark going in the runoff. On April 5, 2022, Larry Heikkila won the runoff election and became mayor of Norman, Oklahoma. Heikkila opposed mask mandates and other COVID-19 measures, while Clark had supported them.

General Results

Results

Endorsements

Runoff Election

Results

Endorsements

References

Norman, Oklahoma
Norman, Oklahoma
Norman, Oklahoma